Jason Turner (born January 31, 1975 in Rochester, New York) is an American sport shooter and Olympic athlete who finished fourth at the 2008 Olympic Games in Beijing in the 10 metre air pistol final. Bronze medalist Kim Jong Su later tested positive for propranolol, disqualifying him and upgrading Turner's position to third. Turner had finished on exactly the same score as his countryman Brian Beaman, but defeated him in a seemingly uninteresting shoot-off for fourth place that would later secure him the bronze medal.

As of November 19, 2018, Turner is the National Pistol Coach for USA Shooting.

References

External links
 
 Jason Turner at USA Shooting
 Jason Turner  at About.com

1975 births
Living people
American male sport shooters
ISSF pistol shooters
Shooters at the 2003 Pan American Games
Shooters at the 2004 Summer Olympics
Shooters at the 2007 Pan American Games
Shooters at the 2008 Summer Olympics
Shooters at the 2012 Summer Olympics
Olympic bronze medalists for the United States in shooting
Sportspeople from Rochester, New York
Medalists at the 2008 Summer Olympics
Pan American Games gold medalists for the United States
Pan American Games medalists in shooting
Shooters at the 2015 Pan American Games
Medalists at the 2007 Pan American Games
20th-century American people
21st-century American people